Lex Albrecht (born 6 April 1987) is a Canadian racing cyclist, who most recently rode for American amateur team Fearless Femme Racing. She competed in the 2013 UCI women's road race in Florence.

Major results

Source:
2011
 2nd Road race, National Road Championships
2013
 2nd  Road race, Jeux de la Francophonie
 National Road Championships
3rd Road race
7th Time trial
 6th Philadelphia Cycling Classic
 10th Chrono Gatineau
2014
 1st Overall Tour de Murrieta
 2nd Philadelphia Cycling Classic
 4th Grand Prix cycliste de Gatineau
 6th Winston-Salem Cycling Classic
2015
 San Dimas Stage Race
1st  Mountains classification
1st Stage 2
 1st  Mountains classification Redlands Bicycle Classic
 8th Time trial, National Road Championships
 8th Philadelphia Cycling Classic
 9th Overall Tour of California
2016
 7th Overall La Route de France
 10th Road race, National Road Championships
 10th Winston-Salem Cycling Classic
2017
 1st Stage 2 Tour of the Gila
 1st Stage 2 Thüringen Rundfahrt der Frauen
 6th Winston-Salem Cycling Classic

References

External links

 
 

1987 births
Living people
Canadian female cyclists
Cyclists from Ontario
Sportspeople from Barrie